Kim Jae-young (born September 30, 1988) is a South Korean actor and model.

Filmography

Television series

Film

Awards and nominations

References

External links 
 Kim Jae-young at ESteem Entertainment 
 
 

1988 births
Living people
South Korean male television actors
South Korean male film actors